From 2005 to early 2019, the definitions of the SI base units were as follows:

References 

SI units